The Balloon Goes Up is a 1942 British, black-and-white, comedy, musical, war film, directed by Redd Davis and starring Ronald Shiner, Ethel Revnell, Gracie West, Donald Peers and Elsie Wagstaff. It was produced by New Realm Pictures.

Synopsis
The title refers to the 'balloon going up', a popular euphemism for an anticipated German invasion of Britain during the Second World War. This musical-comedy film is a collection of Music hall gags and radio one-line jokes. It is also an anti-Nazi war film.

The term was also used by members of the US military up to the 1990s as a euphemism for World War Three starting with the Soviet Union.

References

External links
 
 
 

1942 films
1942 musical comedy films
1940s war comedy films
British black-and-white films
Films directed by Redd Davis
British World War II propaganda films
British musical comedy films
British war comedy films
British World War II films
1942 war films
1940s English-language films